St. Paul University Quezon City, also referred to as SPUQC or SPU Quezon City, is a private, sectarian and coeducational university located in New Manila, Quezon City. It was previously an all-girls' school and turned co-ed beginning school year 2006-2007.

Situated on a gentle slope of what was originally known as the New Manila Subdivisions, the SPUQC campus now occupies an entire block bordered by Aurora Boulevard, Gilmore Avenue, 3rd Street, and Doña Hemady Avenue in Mariana, Quezon City.

In June 2006, SPUQC started to open its doors to young men who desire to undergo their college education and formation in St. Paul University of Quezon City. The High School Department followed suit when the first set of graduates from the co-ed Grade School enrolled in the High School in June 2008. Its sister school St. Paul College Pasig remained an exclusive all-girls school.

St. Paul University of Quezon City is recognized by the Department of Education and the Commission on Higher Education and also a charter member of the Philippine Accrediting Association of Schools, Colleges and Universities (PAASCU). It has earned Level III accreditation on all of its respective departments and schools. In May 2012, PAASCU granted re-accredited status to the Science, Liberal Arts, and Business Programs (except accountancy).

History
The college was established as St. Paul College Quezon City Branch in 1946. It was founded by the Sisters of St. Paul of Chartres (SPC), a congregation established in Chartres, France, by Father Louis Chauvet in 1696. The college originally catered to young women of the upscale New Manila area.

The Liberal Arts and Commerce programs were first granted accreditation status by PAASCU in 1983 along with the High School Department. The application for the accreditation of the Science programs followed in 1989. All these programs have periodically been granted re-accreditation status since then.

The grade school was initially offered to boys and girls. Eventually, the high school and college levels were exclusively offered to women, making the school a full women's college in 1966.

Accreditation
The college enjoys full autonomy status from the Commission on Higher Education of the Philippines. It was also awarded a Level III Accreditation (the second highest possible level) by the Philippine Accrediting Association of Schools, Colleges, and Universities (PAASCU).

Academics
The college is also part of the Women's Consortium Colleges which includes Miriam College in Katipunan, Assumption College San Lorenzo in Makati, La Consolacion College Manila in Mendiola, and the College of the Holy Spirit Manila in Mendiola.

Notable alumni
 Rhea Santos (Mass Communications Batch 2000) - GMA-7 newscaster
 Tootsie Guevara (Hotel and Restaurant Management Batch 2003) - Former ABS-CBN actress, Singer and Recording artist.
 Liezl Sumilang-Martinez - Actress and MTRCB Board
 Maxine Medina - (HS Batch 2009) - Miss Universe Philippines 2016
 Alex Gonzaga - (HS Batch) - Actress and Vlogger
 Adeline Dumapong-Ancheta - (Computer Science) - Filipina Paralympic powerlifter 
 Cristina Pantoja-Hidalgo - (HS Batch, Valedictorian) - Fictionist, critic, and pioneering writer of Creative nonfiction.
 Maureen Larrazabal - (Communication Arts in Interior Design) - Actress, singer, and  model.
 Nikki Coseteng - Former Senator of the Philippines from 1992 to 2001.

See also
St. Paul University Philippines, Tuguegarao City
St. Paul University Manila, Metro Manila
St. Paul University Dumaguete, Negros Oriental
St. Paul University Iloilo, Iloilo City
St. Paul University Surigao, Surigao del Norte

References

External links
 

Liberal arts colleges in the Philippines
Catholic universities and colleges in Metro Manila
Catholic elementary schools in Metro Manila
Catholic secondary schools in Metro Manila
Universities and colleges in Quezon City
Educational institutions established in 1946
1946 establishments in the Philippines